Vorona Monastery is an Orthodox Monastery in Romania, situated on the territory of Vorona commune (Botoșani County). It is set amidst a forest 2 km away from Vorona village. It is listed as a historic monument by Romania's Ministry of Culture and National Identity.

See also
Teoctist Arăpașu

References

 *** - "România - Harta mănăstirilor" (Ed. Amco Press, 2000)
 Gh. Ciobotaru - "Istoria m-rii Vorona", teză de licență, Institutul Teologic București, 1948
 Nicolae Iorga - "O m-re de cărturari: Vorona", în "Buletinul Comisiunii Monumentelor Istorice", annul XXV (1933), p. 120.
 Mitropolia Moldovei și Sucevei - "Monumente istorice bisericești din Mitropolia Moldovei și Sucevei" (Ed. Mitropoliei Moldovei și Sucevei, Iași, 1974), p. 361-362
 Al. Simionescu - "Mănăstirea Vorona", în "Revista Moldovei", annul I (1921), nr. 3–4, p. 20-25, nr. 6, p. 8-17, nr. 6, p. 13-20, nr. 9, p. 18-24, nr. 11, p. 11-15, nr. 12, p. 26-28, 1922, nr. 3–4, p. 38-40, nr. 6, p. 22-29, nr. 7, p. 20-30, și Botoșani, 1922, 67 p. + 7 pl.
 Gh. D. Vasiliu - "Sihăstria Voronei. Însemnări monografice", în "Mitropolia Moldovei", 1943, nr. 3–4, p. 116-120.

External links
Official website

Romanian Orthodox monasteries of Botoșani County
Historic monuments in Botoșani County